Rusty is a Canadian alternative rock band formed in 1994 in Toronto, Ontario, Canada.  The band earned a 1996 Juno Award nomination in the category Best Alternative Album for Fluke.

History
Rusty's origins are in One Free Fall, a band from Wolfville, Nova Scotia who moved to Toronto in 1988. That band's core members were vocalist Ken MacNeil, guitarist Sandy Graham, bassist Jim Moore and drummer Bob Vespaziani. That band signed to independent label Handsome Boy Records, released the album Mud Creek in 1993 and collaborated with Art Bergmann on a cover of "Prisoners of Rock 'n Roll" for the Neil Young tribute album Borrowed Tunes: A Tribute to Neil Young, but broke up in 1994 before achieving any notable success.

Following their breakup, MacNeil, Moore and Vespaziani joined with former Doughboys member Scott McCullough to form Rusty, and recorded the EP Wake Me in 1994. A video for the song "Wake Me" would become a minor hit on MuchMusic. Released on Handsome Boy Records, the EP was popular on Canadian campus radio, and led to a major label distribution deal with BMG Records for their full-length album Fluke in July 1995. Vespaziani left the group and was replaced by Mitch Perkins.

Led by the hit single "Misogyny", which featured a video consisting of clips from Canadian filmmaker Bruce LaBruce's film Hustler White as well as Canadian singer Danko Jones, Fluke was the band's commercial breakthrough, also spawning the single "California", and earning a Juno Award nomination for Best Alternative Album. The album was produced by Chris Wardman, who also played guitar on the tracks "Groovy Dead" and "California".

In 1996, the band contributed a cover of "Let's Break Robert Out of Jail" to the compilation album A Tribute to Hard Core Logo. Also in 1996 the song "Punk" was included on soundtrack to Chris Farley's movie Black Sheep.

The band's follow-up album, Sophomoric, was released in February 1997, including the singles "Empty Cell" and "Oh No Joe". Perkins left the band that year and was replaced by former Bootsauce drummer John Lalley.  Perkins left the group due to creative differences and released an electronic album independently with Andrew Massey under the name "Blu Pernu". This year the band also contributed a cover of "Scratches And Needles" by The Nils to the compilation album "Scratches & Needles - A Tribute to the Nils" from Magwheel Records.

In 1998, Rusty released their third full-length album, Out of Their Heads. In May 1999, it was revealed that the band had broken up. The band played their farewell show on November 25, 2000 at The Opera House in Toronto.

Reunion, new album
In 2011, Rusty reunited for the 2011 NXNE festival. The band continued to perform occasional shows in the following years.

In December 2017, the band launched a crowdfunding for a new album through PledgeMusic.

The band released the new album, titled Dogs of Canada, on June 23, 2018.

Discography

Albums
 Fluke (1995)
 Sophomoric (1997)
 Out of Their Heads (1998)
 Dogs of Canada (2018)

EPs
 Fluke (1994)

Singles

References

External links

Canadian alternative rock groups
Musical groups from Toronto
Musical groups established in 1994
Musical groups disestablished in 2000
1994 establishments in Ontario
2000 disestablishments in Ontario